Corunastylis trifida, commonly known as the blackish midge orchid, is a small terrestrial orchid endemic to New South Wales. It has a single thin leaf fused to the flowering stem and up to twenty five dark purplish-black and green flowers. It grows in heath in scattered places in the Sydney basin.

Description
As with others in the genus, the flowers are inverted so that the labellum is above the column rather than below it. There is a broad, tapering callus in the centre of the labellum and extending nearly to its tip. Flowering occurs from January to April.

Taxonomy and naming
The blackish midge orchid was first formally described in 1941 by Herman Rupp who gave it the name Prasophyllum  trifidum and published the description in The Victorian Naturalist. The specimen was collected near Castlecrag. In 2004, David Jones and Mark Clements changed the name to Corunastylis trifida. The specific epithet (trifida) is a Latin word meaning "three-cleft", referring to the shape of the column.

The World Checklist of Selected Plant Families retains the name Prasophyllum trifidum for C. trifida.

Distribution and habitat
Corunastylis trifida grows in heath or heathy forest between Kurri Kurri and Middle Harbour.

References

External links
 

laminata
Endemic orchids of Australia
Orchids of New South Wales
Plants described in 1941